General elections were held in Mexico on June 26 and July 10, 1910. The contested election instigated the beginning of the Mexican Revolution and preceded the end of the 35-year period of Mexican history known as the Porfiriato.

Context
Porfirio Díaz had been elected as President of Mexico six times prior to 1910 without fair elections and ruled as dictator.  The 1910 election was intended to be the first free election of the Porfiriato, but after opposition leader Francisco I. Madero appeared poised to upset the Porfirian regime, Madero was arrested and imprisoned before the election was held.  Despite Madero's popularity, Diaz was controversially announced as the election winner with almost 99% of the votes.

The rigged election was not recognized by Madero who published the Plan of San Luis Potosí in October 1910 that served to incite the Mexican Revolution.

Campaign images

Results

President

Vice-President

References

Presidential elections in Mexico
Election and referendum articles with incomplete results
Mexico
General